The 1959 William & Mary Indians football team represented William & Mary during the 1959 NCAA University Division football season. The September 26th contest against the #13 Naval Academy marked the inaugural game in the brand new Navy–Marine Corps Memorial Stadium, which replaced Thompson Stadium as the location for all of Navy's future home games. William & Mary lost the game, 2–29.

Schedule

References

William and Mary
William & Mary Tribe football seasons
William